Kaudena (Nepali: कौडेना)  is a rural municipality in Sarlah i District, a part of Province No. 2 in Nepal. It was formed in 2016 occupying current 7 sections (wards) from previous 7 former VDCs. It occupies an area of 25.33 km2 with a total population of 36,881.

References

Populated places in Sarlahi District
Rural municipalities of Nepal established in 2017
Rural municipalities in Madhesh Province